The Council for the Defence of the British Universities (CDBU) is a group of individuals who express worries about the long-term direction of higher education policy in the United Kingdom and lobby for fundamental changes. They particularly oppose the marketisation of Higher Education in the country.

The CDBU was founded in November 2012
by 66 founding members, including
Sir Michael Atiyah, 
Sir David Attenborough,
Alan Bennett,
Sir Colin Blakemore,
Dame Ruth Deech, Baroness Deech,
Marcus du Sautoy,
Sir Deian Hopkin,
Sir Tim Hunt,
Sir Paul Nurse,
Dame Bridget Ogilvie,
David Pannick, Baron Pannick,
Sir Roger Penrose,
Martin Rees, Baron Rees of Ludlow,
Quentin Skinner, and
Sir Peter Swinnerton-Dyer.
It is incorporated in England as a not for profit company limited by guarantee.

Governance
The CDBU is run by an executive committee whose chair is Gordon Campbell. Current members of the executive committee are Dorothy Bishop, John Dainton, Tim Horder, Howard Hotson, Stephen Huggett,
James Ladyman, Sir Peter Scott, Anne Sheppard, Rowan Tomlinson, and David Wolton.
The current chair of the board of trustees (since 2020) is Rowan Williams, Baron Williams of Oystermouth.

Campaigns and activities
CDBU's three main campaigns are dealing with the Teaching Excellence Framework (TEF), precarious employment in Higher Education, and private for-profit universities. CDBU organises events
and annual lectures; the speaker of the 2019 CDBU lecture was Stephen Toope, the Vice Chancellor of Cambridge University.

References

Advocacy groups in the United Kingdom
Clubs and societies in the United Kingdom